Hong Kong maintains a three-tier system of deposit-taking institutions, i.e. licensed banks, restricted licence banks and deposit-taking companies. They are collectively known as authorized institutions supervised by the Hong Kong Monetary Authority (HKMA).

As one of the top five financial centres worldwide, Hong Kong has one of the highest concentrations of banking institutions in the world, with 70 of the largest 100 banks in the world having an operation in Hong Kong. As of 2019, there were 164 licensed banks, 17 restricted licence banks and 13 deposit-taking companies in business, constituting a total of 194 authorized institutions. In addition, there are 42 local representative offices of foreign banks in Hong Kong.

Licensed banks
Only licensed banks may operate current and savings accounts, accept deposits of any size and maturity from the public, and pay or collect cheques drawn, or paid in, by customers.

Incorporated in Hong Kong

Virtual banks incorporated in Hong Kong

Incorporated outside Hong Kong

Restricted licence banks

Incorporated in Hong Kong

Incorporated outside Hong Kong

Deposit-taking companies
Deposit-taking companies are mostly owned by, or associated with, banks. These companies engage in specialized activities, such as consumer finance and securities business. They may take deposits of HK$100,000 or above with an original term of maturity of at least three months. All deposit-taking companies are incorporated in Hong Kong

Local representative offices (all incorporated outside Hong Kong)
Overseas banks may establish local representative offices in Hong Kong, but they are not allowed to engage in any banking business and their role is confined mainly to liaison work between the bank and its customers in Hong Kong.

Approved money brokers
BGC Capital Markets (Hong Kong) Limited
Bloomberg Tradebook Hong Kong Limited
Currenex, Inc.
EBS Service Company Limited
FX Alliance, Llc
Fxmarketspace Limited
GFI (HK) Brokers Limited
ICAP (Hong Kong) Limited
iMarkets Limited
Korea Money Brokerage Corporation
Lotus Forex Limited
Nittan Capital Asia Limited
Reuters Transaction Services Limited
SMBC Capital Markets Limited
Sendra Holdings Limited
Tradition (Asia) Limited
Tullett Prebon (Hong Kong) Limited

Defunct, renamed or acquired banks

Asia Commercial Bank
Bank of America (Asia)
Bank of Canton
Bank of China Group
Bank of Credit and Commerce International (Hong Kong) Limited
Belgian Bank
Canton Trust Bank
Chartered Bank of India, Australia and China
Chase Manhattan Bank, Hong Kong branch
China & South Sea Bank Limited
China State Bank Limited
Chekiang First Bank
D.A.H. Private Bank Limited
Daiwa Bank, Hong Kong branch
Dao Heng Bank Limited
DBS Kwong On Bank
Far East Bank
First Pacific Bank
Flemings Investment Banking, Hong Kong branch
Fortis Bank Asia HK
Hang Lung Bank
Hongkong Chinese Bank
Hongkong Industrial and Commercial Bank Limited
Hong Nin Savings Bank
Hua Chiao Commercial Bank Limited
International Bank of Asia Limited
Jian Sing Bank Limited
Kincheng Banking Corporation
Kwangtung Provincial Bank
Kwong On Bank
Mercantile Bank of India, London and China, Hong Kong branch
Mingde Bank
National Bank of China
National Commercial Bank Limited
National Industrial Bank of China
Overseas Trust Bank Limited
Oriental Bank Corporation, Hong Kong branch
Po Sang Bank
Sin Hua Bank Limited
Sun Hung Kai Bank Limited
Union Bank of Hong Kong Limited
United Chinese Bank
Wing On Bank
Yien Yieh Commercial Bank

See also
Economy of Hong Kong
List of Hong Kong companies
Hong Kong Association of Banks
List of insurance companies in Hong Kong

References

External links

Hong Kong Monetary Authority (HKMA)
Banks in Hong Kong
Clearing Code and Branch Code List, Hong Kong Interbank Clearing

 
Banks
Hong Kong
Hong Kong